Taher Baghdeh (also Romanized as Ţāher Baghdeh; also known as Ţāher Būghdeh) is a village in Tamugheh Rural District, in the Central District of Saqqez County, Kurdistan Province, Iran. At the 2006 census, its population was 269, in 38 families. The village is populated by Kurds.

References 

Towns and villages in Saqqez County